This page records the details of the Japan national football team in 1999.

Results

Players statistics

External links
Japan Football Association

1999 Team
National football team
Japan